Rebecca bat Meir Tiktiner (died 1605), was a Yiddish writer, whose works include a treatise on Jewish ethics in the style of musar literature as well as a poem about Simchat Torah.

Life
She or her father probably resided in the northeast Poland town of Tykocin. According to the records of the Altneushul, she was married to someone with rabbinic training (ha-rav rabbi).

The ethical treatise, "Meneket Rivkah" (Prague, 1609. Cracow, 1618), is 36 folios long and organized by seven gates. The author focuses on the duties of a housewife in various relationships (e.g., to husband or guest) as well as a general ethical approach, dealing with niddah, health social practices. The treatise includes stories from the Talmud and midrashic literature. Tiktiner differentiates between the wisdom of the body and of the soul (guf and nefesh). This practical guidelines "paint a vivid picture of Jewish women's daily lives in the early modern period." Von Rohde claims that this is "probably the first substantive published book in Yiddish written by a Jewish women)".

Rebecca also wrote a rhymed Yiddish hymn for the holiday of Simḥat Torah, entitled Eyn Simkhas Touro Lid, which describes an eschatological, festive banquet for men and women alike. The poem, which survives in two separate undated 17th century printings, consists of 40 rhyming couplets (with acrostic), in which each verse is followed by the refrain hallelujah.

She died in circa 1550 and was buried in Prague.

See also 
 Paula Dei Mansi

References

Bibliography
Cooper, Levi. "From the Classics: A Remnant of Tiktin". Jewish Educational Leadership Vol 4 no. 1 (Fall 2005) pp. 42–46.
Kadari, Tamar. "Rebecca Tiktiner's Simhat Torah Poem" in Nashim: A Journal of Jewish Women's Studies & Gender Issues Fall 2007, No. 14:233-241
 
 
 
Shmeruk, Chone, "The First Jewish Authoress in Poland - Rivka Tiktiner and her Works”, Gal Ed 4-5 (1978), pp. 1-11 (in Hebrew).
Zinberg, Israel. Old Yiddish Literature from Its Origins to the Haskalah Period. KTAV, 1975. . On Rebecca bat Meir Tiktiner's Simchat Torah poem, see p. 51ff.

16th-century Jews
16th-century Polish women writers
16th-century Polish writers
Judaism and women
People from Tykocin
Polish Ashkenazi Jews
Year of birth unknown
Year of death unknown
Yiddish-language poets